Steel River may refer to:
the Steel River in Ontario, Canada
a Canadian rock band Steel River
a song by Chris Rea which apparently refers to his hometown, Middlesbrough UK
the River Tees which is nicknamed Steel River, especially near Middlesbrough 
There was also a British television show called Steel River Blues which also takes place in Middlesbrough.